The 132nd Armored Brigade "Ariete" is currently the only active armored brigade of the Italian Army. Its core units are tank and Bersaglieri regiments. The brigade's headquarters is in the city of Pordenone and most of its units are based in the North-East of Italy. The brigade's name comes from the battering ram. The brigade draws much of its historical traditions from the 132nd Armored Division "Ariete", which fought in the Western Desert Campaign of World War II. In 1948 the Ariete was reconstituted as division and remained active until 1986. Today the brigade is part of the Division "Vittorio Veneto".

History

World War II 
The 132nd Armored Division "Ariete" was formed in February 1939. In December 1940 the division was sent to Libya to fight in the Western Desert Campaign. The division was destroyed in the Second Battle of El Alamein and declared lost due to wartime events on 8 December 1942.

Reconstitution 
On 23 May 1948 the Italian Army raised the Armored Brigade "Ariete" at Forte Pietralata in Rome. The same year it was transferred to Pordenone in the Friuli region in Northern Italy and assigned to V Army Corps. The brigade consisted of the following units.

 Armored Brigade "Ariete", in Pordenone
  8th Bersaglieri Regiment, in Pordenone
 III Bersaglieri Battalion (M3 Half-tracks)
 V Bersaglieri Battalion (M3 Half-tracks)
  132nd Tank Regiment, in Aviano
 I Tank Battalion (M26 Pershing tanks)
 II Tank Battalion (M26 Pershing tanks)
  132nd Armored Artillery Regiment, in Pordenone
 I Self-propelled Howitzer Group (M7 Priest self-propelled howitzers)
 II Self-propelled Howitzer Group (M7 Priest self-propelled howitzers)
 III Self-propelled Howitzer Group (M7 Priest self-propelled howitzers)
 IV Light Air-defense Group (M1 40mm anti-aircraft guns)
 Engineer Platoon
 Signal Platoon
 Brigade Services

Armored Division "Ariete" 
On 1 October 1952 the brigade was expanded to full division and consisted of the following units:

 Armored Division "Ariete"
  8th Bersaglieri Regiment
 III Bersaglieri Battalion (M3 Half-tracks)
 V Bersaglieri Battalion (M3 Half-tracks)
 XII Bersaglieri Battalion (M3 Half-tracks)
 Bersaglieri Anti-tank Company (M40 recoilless rifles)
  132nd Tank Regiment
 I Tank Battalion (M26 Pershing tanks, later replaced by M47 Patton main battle tanks)
 II Tank Battalion (M26 Pershing tanks, later replaced by M47 Patton main battle tanks)
 III Tank Battalion (M26 Pershing tanks, later replaced by M47 Patton main battle tanks)
  132nd Armored Artillery Regiment
 I Self-propelled Howitzer Group (M7 Priest self-propelled howitzers)
 II Self-propelled Howitzer Group (M7 Priest self-propelled howitzers)
 III Self-propelled Howitzer Group (M7 Priest self-propelled howitzers)
 IV Self-propelled Howitzer Group (M7 Priest self-propelled howitzers)
 V Light Air-defense Group (M1 40mm anti-aircraft guns)
 VI Light Air-defense Group (M1 40mm anti-aircraft guns)
  Armored Cavalry Squadron "Cavalleggeri Guide" (M8 Greyhound)
 132nd Engineer Company (expanded to Engineer Battalion "Ariete" on 1 July 1958)
 132nd Signal Company (expanded to Signal Battalion "Ariete" on 1 October 1958)
 Divisional Services

1963 reorganization 
In 1963 Italian divisions adapted their organization to NATO standards and thus added a brigade level to the divisions structure. In the same year the reconstitution of the 32nd Tank Regiment began. The Ariete was now organized as follows:

 Armored Division "Ariete",  in Pordenone
 I Mechanized Brigade "Ariete", in Pordenone (formed 1 January 1963)
  8th Bersaglieri Regiment, in Pordenone
 III Bersaglieri Battalion (M113 armored personnel carriers)
 XII Bersaglieri Battalion (M113 armored personnel carriers)
 VII Tank Battalion (M47 Patton main battle tanks)
 Bersaglieri Anti-tank Company (M40 recoilless rifles)
 I/132nd Armored Artillery Regiment (M7 Priest self propelled howitzers)
 I Service Battalion
 1st Engineer Company
 1st Signal Company
 II Armored Brigade "Ariete", in Pordenone (formed 1 October 1963)
  32nd Tank Regiment, in Cordenons (operational from 1 March 1964)
 III Tank Battalion (M47 Patton main battle tanks)
 V Tank Battalion (M47 Patton main battle tanks)
 XXIII Bersaglieri Battalion (M113 armored personnel carriers)
 II/132nd Armored Artillery Regiment (M7 Priest self propelled howitzers)
 II Service Battalion
 2nd Engineer Company
 2nd Signal Company
 III Armored Brigade "Ariete", in Maniago (formed 1 January 1963)
  132nd Tank Regiment, in Aviano
 VIII Tank Battalion (M47 Patton main battle tanks)
 X Tank Battalion (M47 Patton main battle tanks)
 XXXVIII Bersaglieri Battalion (M113 armored personnel carriers)
 III/132nd Armored Artillery Regiment (M7 Priest self propelled howitzers)
 III Service Battalion
 3rd Engineer Company
 3rd Signal Company
 Artillery Brigade "Ariete" (1 October 1963 in Casarsa della Delizia)
  132nd Armored Artillery Regiment, in Pordenone
 IV Heavy Self-propelled Field Artillery Group (M44 self propelled howitzers)
 V Heavy Self-propelled Artillery Group (M55 self propelled howitzers)
 VI Light Air-defense Group (L60 40mm anti-aircraft guns)
  XIX Reconnaissance Squadrons Group "Cavalleggeri Guide" (M24 Chaffee (M24 Chaffee light tanks and M113 armored personnel carriers)
 Engineer Battalion "Ariete"
 Signal Battalion "Ariete"
 Light Airplane Section "Ariete" (L-21B airplanes)
 Helicopter Section "Ariete" (AB 47J helicopters)

On 1 October 1968 the brigade headquarters were disbanded and the divisions returned to its former structure. The "Ariete" was part of the 5th Army Corps based in North-Eastern Italy. The 5th Army Corps was tasked (defending the Yugoslav-Italian border against possible attacks by either the Warsaw Pact, or Yugoslavia or both. The Ariete was the corps' armored reserve.

1975 army reform  
Before the Italian Army reform of 1975 the division had the following organization:

  132nd Armored Division Ariete|Armored Division "Ariete", in Pordenone
  8th Bersaglieri Regiment, in Pordenone
 Command and Services Company, in Pordenone (includes an anti-tank guided missile platoon)
 III Bersaglieri Battalion, in Pordenone (M113 armored personnel carriers)
 VII Tank Battalion, in Vivaro (M60A1 Patton main battle tanks)
 XII Bersaglieri Battalion, in Pordenone (M113 armored personnel carriers)
  32nd Tank Regiment, in Tauriano
 Command and Services Company, in Tauriano (includes an anti-tank guided missile platoon)
 III Tank Battalion, in Tauriano (M60A1 Patton main battle tanks)
 V Tank Battalion, in Tauriano (M60A1 Patton main battle tanks)
 XXIII Bersaglieri Battalion, in Tauriano (M113 armored personnel carriers)
  132nd Tank Regiment, in Aviano
 Command and Services Company, in Aviano (includes an anti-tank guided missile platoon)
 VIII Tank Battalion, in Aviano (M60A1 Patton main battle tanks)
 X Tank Battalion, in Aviano (M60A1 Patton main battle tanks)
 XXXVIII Bersaglieri Battalion, in Aviano (M113 armored personnel carriers)
  132nd Armored Artillery Regiment, in Casarsa della Delizia
 Command and Services Battery, in Casarsa della Delizia
 I Self-propelled Field Artillery Group, in Vacile (M109G 155mm self-propelled howitzers)
 II Self-propelled Field Artillery Group, in Sequals (M109G 155mm self-propelled howitzers)
 III Self-propelled Field Artillery Group, in Maniago (M109G 155mm self-propelled howitzers)
 IV Heavy Self-propelled Field Artillery Group, in Casarsa della Delizia (M109G 155mm self-propelled howitzers)
 V Heavy Self-propelled Artillery Group, in Casarsa della Delizia (M55 203mm self-propelled howitzers)
 VI Light Anti-aircraft Artillery Group (Reserve), in Casarsa della Delizia (Bofors 40mm anti-aircraft guns and 12.7mm anti-aircraft machine guns)
 Artillery Specialists Battery, in Casarsa della Delizia
 "Cavalleggeri Guide" Squadrons Group, in Casarsa della Delizia (Fiat Campagnola reconnaissance vehicles and M47 Patton tanks)
 LXXIII Infantry Fortification Battalion "Lombardia", in Arzene / Latisana
 Light Aviation Unit "Ariete", at Casarsa Air Base (L-19E Bird Dog light aircraft and AB 206 reconnaissance helicopters)
 Engineer Battalion "Ariete", in Motta di Livenza
 Signal Battalion "Ariete", in Casarsa della Delizia
 Services Grouping "Ariete", in Pordenone
 Command and Services Company, in Pordenone
 Supply, Repairs, Recovery Unit "Ariete", in Pordenone
 Transport Unit "Ariete", in Pordenone
 I Services Battalion "Ariete", in Pordenone
 II Services Battalion "Ariete", in Vacile
 III Services Battalion "Ariete", in Maniago

In 1975 the Italian Army undertook a major reorganization of it forces: the regimental level was abolished and battalions came under direct command of newly formed multi-arms brigades. The 8th Bersaglieri Regiment became the 8th Mechanized Brigade "Garibaldi" based in Pordenone, the 32nd Tank Regiment became the 32nd Armored Brigade "Mameli" based in Tauriano, and the 132nd Tank Regiment became the 132nd Armored Brigade "Manin" in Aviano. All three brigades were named for personalities of the First Italian War of Independence. On 1 October 1975 the Ariete took command of the three brigades and additional units to bring it up to full strength.

  Armored Division "Ariete", in Pordenone
 Command Unit "Ariete", in Pordenone
 Divisional Artillery Command, in Casarsa della Delizia
  108th Heavy Self-propelled Field Artillery Group "Cosseria", in Casarsa della Delizia (M109G 155mm self-propelled howitzers)
  132nd Heavy Self-propelled Field Artillery Group "Rovereto", in Casarsa della Delizia (M109G 155mm self-propelled howitzers)
 Artillery Specialists Group "Ariete", in Casarsa della Delizia
 14th Light Anti-aircraft Artillery Group "Astore" (Reserve), in Casarsa della Delizia
  19th Squadrons Group "Cavalleggeri Guide", in Casarsa della Delizia (M47 Patton tanks, M113 armored personnel carriers and AR59 Campagnola reconnaissance vehicles)
  14th Bersaglieri (Recruits Training) Battalion "Sernaglia", in Albenga
  16th Infantry (Recruits Training) Battalion "Savona", in Savona
  73rd Infantry Fortification Battalion "Lombardia", in Arzene (9x companies)
  132nd Engineer Battalion "Livenza", in Motta di Livenza
  232nd Signal Battalion "Fadalto", in Casarsa della Delizia
  Logistic Battalion "Ariete", in Casarsa della Delizia
 49th Reconnaissance Helicopters Squadrons Group "Capricorno", at Casarsa Airport
 Command and Services Squadron
 491st Reconnaissance Helicopters Squadron (AB 206 reconnaissance helicopters)
 492nd Reconnaissance Helicopters Squadron (AB 206 reconnaissance helicopters)
 Medical Battalion "Ariete" (Reserve), in Casarsa della Delizia
 Carabinieri Company "Ariete", in Pordenone
  8th Mechanized Brigade "Garibaldi", in Pordenone
 Command and Signal Unit "Garibaldi", in Pordenone
  7th Tank Battalion "M.O. Di Dio", in Vivaro (M60A1 Patton main battle tanks) 
  3rd Bersaglieri Battalion "Cernaia", in Pordenone
  11th Bersaglieri Battalion "Caprera", in Orcenico Superiore
  26th Bersaglieri Battalion "Castelfidardo", in Pordenone
  19th Self-propelled Field Artillery Group "Rialto", in Sequals (M109G 155mm self-propelled howitzers)
  Logistic Battalion "Garibaldi", in Pordenone
 Anti-tank Company "Garibaldi", in Vivaro (BGM-71 TOW anti-tank guided missiles)
 Engineer Company "Garibaldi", in Orcenico Superiore
  32nd Armored Brigade "Mameli", in Tauriano
 Command and Signal Unit "Mameli", in Tauriano
  3rd Tank Battalion "M.O. Galas", in Tauriano (M60A1 Patton main battle tanks)
  5th Tank Battalion "M.O. Chiamenti", in Tauriano (M60A1 Patton main battle tanks)
  23rd Bersaglieri Battalion "Castel di Borgo", in Tauriano
  12th Self-propelled Field Artillery Group "Capua", in Vacile (M109G 155mm self-propelled howitzers)
  Logistic Battalion "Mameli", in Vacile
 Anti-tank Company "Mameli", in Vacile (BGM-71 TOW anti-tank guided missiles)
 Engineer Company "Mameli", in Vacile
  132nd Armored Brigade "Manin", in Aviano
 Command and Signal Unit "Manin", in Aviano
  8th Tank Battalion "M.O. Secchiaroli", in Aviano (M60A1 Patton main battle tanks)
  10th Tank Battalion "M.O. Bruno", in Aviano (M60A1 Patton main battle tanks)
  27th Bersaglieri Battalion "Jamiano", in Aviano
  20th Self-propelled Field Artillery Group "Piave", in Maniago (M109G 155mm self-propelled howitzers)
  Logistic Battalion "Manin", in Maniago
 Anti-tank Company "Manin", in Aviano (BGM-71 TOW anti-tank guided missiles)
 Engineer Company "Manin", in Maniago

The division also stored the equipment for 16 companies of a second fortification battalion in Latisana, which in case of war would have been filled with reservists and named 74th Infantry Fortification Battalion "Pontida".

Armored Brigade "Ariete" 

On 1 October 1986 the Italian Army abolished the divisional level and brigades, that until then had been under one of the Army's four divisions, came forthwith under direct command of the Army's 3rd Army Corps or 5th Army Corps. As the Armored Division "Ariete" carried a historically significant name, the division ceased to exist on 30 September in Pordenone, but the next day in the same location the 132nd Armored Brigade "Ariete" was activated. The new brigade took command of the units of the 132nd Armored Brigade "Manin", whose name was stricken from the roll of active units of the Italian Army.

The brigade came under direct command of the 5th Army Corps. The 5th Army Corps was tasked (defending the Yugoslav-Italian border against possible attacks by either the Warsaw Pact, or Yugoslavia or both. The brigade's authorized strength was 3,381 men (214 Officers, 516 non-commissioned officers and 2,651 soldiers) and it was initially composed by the following units:

  132nd Armored Brigade "Ariete", in Pordenone
 Command and Signal Unit "Ariete", in Pordenone
  8th Tank Battalion "M.O. Secchiaroli", in Aviano (M60A1 Patton main battle tanks)
  10th Tank Battalion "M.O. Bruno", in Aviano (M60A1 Patton main battle tanks)
  13th Tank Battalion "M.O. Pascucci", in Cordenons (Leopard 1A2 main battle tanks, transferred from the Mechanized Brigade "Brescia" on 1 October 1986)
  27th Bersaglieri Battalion "Jamiano", in Aviano (VCC-1 armored personnel carriers)
  20th Self-propelled Field Artillery Group "Piave", in Maniago (M109G 155mm Self-propelled howitzers)
  Logistic Battalion "Ariete", in Maniago
 Anti-tank Company "Ariete", in Aviano (BGM-71 TOW anti-tank guided missiles)
 Engineer Company "Ariete", in Maniago

After the Cold War 
On 10 January 1991 the brigade disbanded the 10th Tank Battalion and the 20th Artillery Group. In December 1989 the 13th Tank Battalion had been reduced to a reserve unit and was then transferred to the Mechanized Brigade "Mantova". As replacement the brigade received units from brigades disbanded during the army's drawdown of forces after the end of the Cold War in 1991: from the disbanded Armored Brigade "Mameli" came the 3rd Tank Battalion "M.O. Galas", the 5th Tank Battalion "M.O. Chiamenti" and the 23rd Bersaglieri Battalion "Castel di Borgo" and from the Mechanized Brigade "Garibaldi", which had moved to Caserta in the south of Italy, came the 19th Self-propelled Field Artillery Group "Rialto" and 26th Bersaglieri Battalion "Castelfidardo", which left the brigade already after half a year.

In 1992 the brigade received the 2nd (Recruits Training) Battalion "Pordenone", while the 23rd Bersaglieri Battalion moved to Trapani in Sicily to join the Mechanized Brigade "Aosta". The same year the brigade's battalions returned to be called regiments, although size and composition did not change. On 31 July 1995 the 63rd Tank Regiment in Cordenons transferred from the Mechanized Brigade "Mantova" to the Ariete. On 30 November of the same year the 63rd Tank Regiment was renamed as 132nd Tank Regiment and the tank unit in Aviano was disbanded.

In 1997 the 33rd Tank Regiment of the Mechanized Brigade "Friuli" arrived and when the Mechanized Brigade "Mantova" was disbanded on 30 August of the same year the Ariete received the 82nd Mechanized Infantry Regiment "Torino" in Cormons, but already on 5 November 2001 the 82nd Regiment moved to Barletta in Southern Italy to join the Armored Brigade "Pinerolo". On 1 December 2000 the Ariete received the 10th Engineer Regiment. When the Armored Brigade "Centauro" disbanded on 5 October 2002 the Ariete received the 3rd Bersaglieri Regiment and the 4th Tank Regiment. On 25 November 2009 the 3rd Bersaglieri Regiment moved to Sardinia and joined the Mechanized Brigade "Sassari".

Missions 
In 1998 the brigade's headquarters, Command and Tactical Support Battalion, and Logistic Battalion were deployed for a tour of duty in Sarajevo (Bosnia and Herzegovina), under the provision of the SFOR mandate for Operation Constant Forge. Later the brigade deployed three times to Kosovo (1999–2000, 2001, 2002) in Operation Joint Guardian, and later in Operation Consistent Effort, attached to NATO's Kosovo Force.

In 2001, the first enlisted women joined the ranks of the brigade. These were later followed by female NCOs and Officers.

In 2002, elements from 10th Engineer Regiment, and in 2004 the 132nd Artillery Regiment, were deployed to Afghanistan. A significant part of the brigade was twice deployed to Iraq - first in early 2004 and a second time from late 2005 to early 2006. The latest overseas commitments were two deployments to Lebanon from early October 2007 to Spring 2008, then again in early summer to late Fall 2009. Small contribution of personnel (staff officers and NCOs) have been and are being provided to nearly all overseas commitments of the Italian Army, from the Balkans, to Multinational HQs all around the world, including OMLT mentors supporting and advising the Afghan National Army in its struggle against insurgents.

Current organization 

The 132nd Armored Brigade "Ariete" together (the Bersaglieri Brigade "Garibaldi" form the heavy component of the Italian Army. The brigade is part of the Division "Vittorio Veneto" based in Florence. During the 2013 reform the brigade transferred the 4th Tank Regiment to the Bersaglieri Brigade "Garibaldi" and received the Regiment "Lancieri di Novara" (5th) from the Cavalry Brigade "Pozzuolo del Friuli". The brigade headquarter is based in Pordenone and as of 4 October 2022 the brigade consists of the following units:

  132nd Armored Brigade "Ariete", in Pordenone
  7th Tank Command and Tactical Supports Unit "M.O. Di Dio", in Pordenone (Friuli-Venezia Giulia)
  Regiment "Lancieri di Novara" (5th), in Codroipo (Centauro tank destroyers and VTLM Lince vehicles)
  32nd Tank Regiment, in Tauriano (Ariete main battle tanks)
  132nd Tank Regiment, in Cordenons (Ariete main battle tanks)
  11th Bersaglieri Regiment, in Orcenico Superiore (Dardo infantry fighting vehicles)
  132nd Field Artillery Regiment "Ariete", in Maniago (PzH 2000 self-propelled howitzers)
  10th Engineer Regiment, in Cremona
  Logistic Regiment "Ariete", in Maniago

All regiments are battalion sized.

Equipment 
The tank regiments are equipped with Ariete main battle tanks. The Bersaglieri regiment fields Dardo infantry fighting vehicles. The "Lancieri di Novara" Cavalry regiment is equipped with a mix of Centauro tank destroyers and VTLM Lince vehicles. The artillery regiment is equipped with PzH 2000 self-propelled howitzers.

Gorget patches 

The personnel of the brigade's units wears the following gorget patches:

References

External links 
 Italian Army Homepage: Ariete Armored Brigade

Armored brigades of Italy